The Mummy, or Ramses the Damned is a 1989 horror novel by American writer  Anne Rice. Taking place during the early twentieth century, it follows the collision between a British archeologist's family and a resurrected mummy. The novel ends with the statement, "The Adventures of Ramses the Damned Shall Continue", and twenty-eight years later, Rice fulfilled this promise with Ramses the Damned: The Passion of Cleopatra, written in collaboration with her son, novelist Christopher Rice. A third jointly-authored novel in this series, Ramses the Damned: The Reign of Osiris, was released on February 1, 2022, two months after Anne Rice's death.

Plot introduction
During the Edwardian period in 1914, a wealthy shipping-magnate-turned-archaeologist, Lawrence Stratford, discovers an unusual tomb. The mummy inside, in its left-behind notes, claims to be the famed pharaoh Ramses II, despite the tomb's dating only to the first century B.C. (the historical Ramses II died in 1224 B.C.). Before he can fully investigate this claim, Lawrence unexpectedly falls dead, and those around him fear he was the victim of a curse placed on the tomb. Nonetheless, the mummy and other belongings are shipped off to London, and placed on temporary display in Lawrence's house before they are taken by the British Museum.

Lawrence's daughter Julie Stratford is the designated heir to her father's shipping company, as well as the dysfunctional family that surrounds it. Her cousin Henry is an alcoholic and gambling addict who has been draining the family fortune with the aid of his father. Julie is engaged to marry Alex Savarell, a viscount and son of Elliott, the current Earl of Rutherford. Although the marriage is a standard alliance between the wealthy Stratfords and an impoverished family of nobles, Alex truly loves Julie, though she is unable to return these feelings.

Into this unstable situation comes the mummy Ramses, who awakes shortly after his sarcophagus is placed in Julie's house.

Plot summary
Henry murders his uncle Lawrence with a poison found in the mummy's tomb. When Henry tries to poison Julie in the same manner, Ramses comes to life and attempts to kill Henry, but succeeds only in scaring him away. After his awakening, Julie and Ramses are instantly attracted to each other. Ramses quickly adopts a pseudonym, "Reginald Ramsey", and claims to be an Egyptologist to throw off the accusation made by the frightened Henry that a "bloody mummy" rose from the crypt to harm him. With superhuman intelligence and the ability to learn quickly, Ramses quickly learns the English language and, with the help of an eager Julie, is given a tour of modern London and new technology that had arisen during the past two thousand years. While Henry's accusations are passed off as the rantings of a drunkard, the elderly and ailing Elliott Savarell suspects that it may be the truth. He trails Ramses and comes to believe that he is who Henry claims him to be.

During Ramses's reign as pharaoh, he had learned from a Hittite priestess the formula for an elixir that grants eternal life. The potion not only made him immortal, but also allows his body to regenerate from damage that would kill a normal human, such as multiple bullet wounds. He requires neither food nor drink nor sleep, and only the sun's rays to maintain his life. However, he still craves food and certain other physical pleasures, like sex, smoking, and alcohol.

Ramses nurses a deep secret. Prior to the Roman conquest of Egypt, he had served as an immortal advisor to its kings and queens, and the last person to awake him for consultation had been Cleopatra, the last ruler of Egypt. Although he served as Cleopatra's counsel (and encouraged her to romance Julius Caesar in a bid to keep the country independent), he had also fallen in love with her, and had revealed to her the secrets of the elixir. Having fallen in love with Mark Antony in defiance of Ramses's advice, Cleopatra refuses the elixir and chooses suicide upon Antony's death. In his depression, Ramses had given himself the name "Ramses the Damned", and had Egyptian priests seal him away underground.

With Julie's encouragement, Ramses begins to recover. While Henry is convinced that Ramses is an evil monster ready to kill the entire family, Elliott reads Lawrence's notes and chases after Ramses to learn the secret of the elixir of immortality. Eventually, Ramses and Julie decide to visit Egypt one last time so that Ramses can say good-bye to his past. Although Ramses appears to be coming to terms with his past, upon visiting the Cairo Museum, he unexpectedly recognizes an unidentified mummy as being that of Cleopatra. Breaking into the museum later at night simply to see her, he impulsively pours some of the elixir onto the dead body. Cleopatra is revived, but by Ramses not pouring the entire vial of elixir on her, the restoration is incomplete; she is a half-formed monstrosity, awake and conscious yet with parts of her face, hands, and torso still gone. Her incomplete brain restoration leaves her not totally coherent; though Ramses later repairs her body with more of the potion, she appears to be insane  and kills a number of people, including Henry. Cleopatra unexpectedly falls in love with Elliot's son Alex though realizes a life with him cannot last because of his mortality and his innocence. Because Ramses would not give her long-ago love Mark Antony the elixir to save his life, Cleopatra holds a passionate hatred for him and seeks to even the score by killing his current love: Julie Stratford.

Cleopatra ultimately falters before killing Julie, realizing that the girl should not be punished for Ramses's actions. She also comes to regret the other murders she has committed. In an attempt to escape Ramses, Cleopatra "dies" when her car is hit by a train and is consumed by a fiery explosion so hot that it "could kill even an immortal". Ramses later gives the elixir to Julie after she attempts suicide in her grief for her loss of him, and he promises to stay with her for eternity. To thank him for his help in covering up all the unusual events, Ramses also gives the elixir to a dying Elliott, who drinks it after serious consideration of the consequences: dying miserably, or living eternally even when wishing for nothing but oblivion. Cleopatra has secretly survived the crash, and awakens under the care of a British doctor in Sudan. She vows to find Ramses again someday for revenge.

Development
The Mummy was originally a film script by Rice, who said producers "wanted to change everything." She explained, "I think I went off to create that book just to spite them, I was so furious."

Major themes

Like the vampires of Rice's Vampire Chronicles, those who take the elixir become immortal, inhumanly strong, and unable to die from normal means. These individuals could even be said to be "reverse vampires" since they derive their strength from the sun, and cannot live without it. Unlike vampires, they are able to eat, drink and function as normal humans. However, this immortality comes with a strange price. Those who drink the potion are constantly driven to sate their senses. They constantly crave food and drink, although they need neither to survive. They have an extremely heightened libido. Moreover, their bodies continually blunt drugs that give humans pleasure. For example, Ramses constantly drinks and smokes because the "buzz" the alcohol or nicotine would normally give him fades after a few moments.

But perhaps most importantly, the elixir causes any organic substance to become invulnerable and self-sustaining. Having once tested it upon livestock and crops in his own time, he had been horrified to find that such things transformed by the elixir cannot be digested and continually regenerate even inside the intestines, with bloody and gruesome results. And once this elixir is used, it cannot be undone and should it be poured into a fire, it would become dust that could then be swept by rain into the rivers or the oceans, creating immortal fish and sea creatures, or watering plants to become invulnerable. Therefore, the elixir, once brewed, cannot be disposed of by any means other than deliberate consumption. For this reason, the elixir's formula is strictly hidden by Ramses, though the ingredients are common and easily  obtained. His feud with Cleopatra before the events of the novel had begun when he refused to create an "immortal army" for Mark Antony's use.

As with many Rice novels, sexuality tends to be fluid. Both Elliott and Lawrence are described as bisexual—when younger, they were lovers, but both eventually married and had children. In the past, Henry had an affair with Elliott as well, but his only reason may have been a failed blackmail attempt, as at the time of the novel, Henry has at least two mistresses.

As always, Rice employs considerable irony. For example, after his death, Henry's corpse ends up in a "mummy factory" (during the Egyptian craze of the early 1900s, natives often took modern corpses and made them into mummies for sale to gullible tourists). Elliott, his nemesis, gets the last laugh when a merchant tries to sell him Henry's mummy.

Allusions and references to other works
Rice credited the authors of several turn-of-the-century mummy stories with her inspiration, including Arthur Conan Doyle ("Lot No. 249" and "The Ring of Thoth"), H. Rider Haggard (She), and "All who have brought 'the mummy' to life in stories, novels and film." England during the late-nineteenth and early-twentieth centuries fell under a fad for Ancient Egypt, a phenomenon also known as Egyptomania which produced many works of fiction which Rice could draw from. It has been argued that William Shakespeare's Antony and Cleopatra, as well as other popular culture representations of Cleopatra, have a discernible influence on Rice's novel.

Reception
Publishers Weekly called the novel "an uneasy marriage of romance and horror ... marinated in sentimentality, melodrama and absurdity ... Missing a ripe opportunity to skewer 20th-century values and sexual mores, [Rice], ever-fascinated with the undead, avoids character and plot development, larding largely lifeless, sloppy prose with a surfeit of epiphanies and calamities."

Sequels
During a 2014 interview, Rice stated that she had delved back into the fictional universe established in The Mummy and that there was a strong possibility she could pen a sequel. In February 2017, Rice announced a new Ramses novel, co-written with her son, novelist Christopher Rice. Ramses the Damned: The Passion of Cleopatra was published on November 21, 2017. A third jointly-authored novel in this series, Ramses the Damned: The Reign of Osiris, was released on February 1, 2022, two months after Anne Rice's death.

References

Fiction set in 1914
1989 American novels
American horror novels
Cultural depictions of Ramesses II
Human-mummy romance in fiction
LGBT speculative fiction novels
Fiction about mummies
Novels by Anne Rice
LGBT-related horror literature
Novels with bisexual themes
Novels about museums
Ballantine Books books